Pro 18 World Tour Golf is a video game developed by Intelligent Games and published by Psygnosis for Microsoft Windows and PlayStation in 1999.

Reception

The game received mixed reviews on both platforms according to the review aggregation website GameRankings. Game Informer gave the PlayStation version an overwhelming dislike, over two months before it was released Stateside. PC Accelerator gave the PC version a mixed review, a few months before its U.S. release date.

References

External links
 

1999 video games
Golf video games
PlayStation (console) games
Psygnosis games
Windows games
Video games developed in the United Kingdom